PeruRail is a railway operator providing tourist, freight, and charter services in southern Peru. It was founded in 1999 by two Peruvian entrepreneurs and the British company Sea Containers.

The main line between the port of Matarani, Arequipa, Cusco and Puno on Lake Titicaca was formerly known as the Ferrocarril del Sur (Peru Southern Railway), and was for a time owned and operated by the ENAFER state company. It is the third highest railway in the world after the Qinghai–Tibet Railway to Tibet and the FCCA line from Lima to Huancayo, and is the longest line in Peru.

From Cusco, PeruRail provides passenger services on the  gauge Ferrocarril Santa Ana to Aguas Calientes, delivering tourists for Machu Picchu.

It operates in a 50/50 joint venture between Belmond Limited and Peruvian Trains and Railways, owned by two Peruvian entrepreneurs; Lorenzo Sousa Debarbieri is the chairman of the board of directors of the company.

Routes

PeruRail's routes are divided into two sections.

The line between Cusco and Machu Picchu - Ferrocarril Santa Ana - is a  narrow gauge line, which boasts a series of five switchbacks called locally 'El Zig-Zag', which enable the train to climb up the steep incline out of Cusco, before it can begin its descent to the Sacred Valley of the Incas and then continue down to Machu Picchu. However, this section of the route (between Cusco San Pedro station and Poroy) - which had been suspended - resumed by Inca Rail from May 2019. Other trains to Machu Picchu leave from Poroy, just outside Cusco, instead.

From Poroy, the narrow-gauge line goes northwest to Ollantaytambo, where the branch from Urubamba joins, then on to Machu Picchu station in Aguas Calientes. Tracks formerly continued into the jungle, but they were destroyed by recent flooding.

The  network, formerly Ferrocarril del Sur, starts at Matarani port, goes through Arequipa and enters Puno Region, where the line splits in two at Juliaca. The eastern branch goes to Puno; the western branch runs into Cusco.

The train makes a stop in La Raya Pass where there is a clear view of the surrounding landscape.

There's no more passenger traffic between Arequipa and Matarani, and it was also suspended on the Juliaca - Arequipa line for several years until May 2017 when the Belmond Andean Explorer was inaugurated.

There is a dual gauge track connection between the San Pedro railway station ( gauge) and the Huanchac Railway station in Cusco. There is a switch-back to reach San Pedro station. The trains for Aguas Calientes (Machu Picchu) leave from San Pedro station.

Route table

Passenger transport

Tourist trains

Cusco - Aguas Calientes (Machu Picchu) 

 
On the route from Cusco to Machu Picchu, PeruRail transports the vast majority of visitors and provides several different services.

The Belmond Hiram Bingham Pullman, named after Machu Picchu's American discoverer, Hiram Bingham, is the most expensive service. It departs from Poroy at 9 a.m., later than other departures. Meals, guides, bus service and entrance to the ruins are included. PeruRail's own lower category Pullman service with dining and observation/bar car resembling to Titicaca Train (see below) was introduced 2017 with the name Sacred Valley.

Other services include the observation car, provided by refurbished 1965-vintage German Ferrostaal railcars, with at-seat refreshments and large side and overhead windows allowing views of the mountainous terrain, and Expedition trains, which offer basic service in upholstered seats at a lower price. Snacks are sold and space is provided for backpacks, particularly for Inca Trail hikers.

Puno (Lake Titicaca) - Juliaca - Cusco -  Arequipa 

The luxury sleeper train, Belmond Andean Explorer is operated from Cusco for a one-night journey to Puno, and a two-night three-day journey to Arequipa. Its carriages were formerly used on the Great South Pacific Express in Australia between 1999 and 2003, and brought to Peru in February 2016.

Until the inauguration of this service in May 2017, the name was featured by a first-class service day train, which was renamed to Titicaca Train. It has Pullman-style dining cars and an open-air observation bar car similar to Hiram Bingham. This service provides a 10-hour trip from Cusco to Puno. The interiors of its vehicles were designed by James Park & Associates, the same company who designed the elegant first-class cabins for Singapore Airlines. The actual work, however, was done in Cusco by Cusquenian workers. After the refurbishment was completed, a traditional Andean ceremony, 'Pago a la Tierra' (payment to Mother Earth), was organised to 'bless' the train. A local shaman presided over the ceremony, which involved many traditional rites.

Local trains 

Although not advertised, PeruRail also offers local trains equipped with wooden seats and that are available only to Peruvian nationals for a fraction of the price charged to tourists.

Freight
PeruRail runs daily freight services between the port of Matarani, the city of Arequipa, and the Andean cities of Juliaca, Puno, and Cuzco. Under PeruRail's administration the tonnage transported increased from 460,000 tons during 1999, 573,000 tons in 2000 to 639,000 tons during 2001.

The main products transported by PeruRail are copper concentrates, fuel, wheat (for Peruvian and Bolivian consumption), coal, cement, soya flour from Bolivia, coffee, beer and non-alcoholic beverages.

Peru Rail transports copper concentrates for the most important mines in Peru, Las Bambas, Cerro Verde and other important mining clients.

Shipping
The Lake Titicaca car float Manco Capac operates across Lake Titicaca between PeruRail's railhead at Puno and the port of Guaqui in Bolivia. PeruRail also owns the former ferry , which was launched on Lake Titicaca in 1931. Ollanta is now refurbished for tourist cruises and PeruRail has leased her out for charter work.

See also

 List of stock used by PeruRail
 Iperú
 La Raya mountain range
 Rail transport in Peru
 Transport in Peru
 Tourism in Peru

Notes

References

External links
 
Main website in Spanish and English
PeruRail Timetables
Brief historical summary of the railroads in Peru
Virtual interactive 360° Tour of the PeruRail train Andean Explorer

Mountain railways
Railway companies of Peru
3 ft gauge railways in Peru
Peruvian brands